Nur-Ali may refer to:
Nur-Ali (name)
Nur Ali, Iran